Abdel Latif Khalaf (born 2 January 1966) is an Egyptian wrestler. He competed in the men's Greco-Roman 57 kg at the 1984 Summer Olympics.

References

1966 births
Living people
Egyptian male sport wrestlers
Olympic wrestlers of Egypt
Wrestlers at the 1984 Summer Olympics
Place of birth missing (living people)
20th-century Egyptian people